Falsotragiscus holdhausi is a species of beetle in the family Cerambycidae, and the only species in the genus Falsotragiscus. It was described by Itzinger in 1934.

References

Tragocephalini
Beetles described in 1934